Guanine nucleotide-binding protein G(I)/G(S)/G(O) subunit gamma-T2 is a protein that in humans is encoded by the GNGT2 gene.

Phototransduction in rod and cone photoreceptors is regulated by groups of signaling proteins. The encoded protein is thought to play a crucial role in cone phototransduction. It belongs to the G protein gamma family and localized specifically in cones. There is evidence for use of multiple polyadenylation sites by this gene.

References

Further reading